Past and Present – Live in Concert is the first live album by Canadian heavy metal band Anvil, released in 1989.

Track listing

Personnel
Anvil
Steve "Lips" Kudlow – vocals, lead guitar
Dave Allison – rhythm guitar
Ian Dickson – bass
Robb Reiner – drums

Production
Paul Lachapelle – producer, engineer, mixing
Guy Chabernau, Robert Margaloff – live recording engineers 
Moshe Schwartz, Brian Slagel – executive producers

References

Anvil (band) albums
1989 live albums
Metal Blade Records live albums
Enigma Records live albums
Roadrunner Records live albums